Richard Stephen Robbins (December 4, 1940 – November 7, 2012) was an American-born composer, best known for his motion picture scores for the Merchant Ivory films.

Robbins was born in South Weymouth, Massachusetts. In November 2012, he died of Parkinson's disease at the age of 71. He died at his home in New York.

Personal life
Robbins began playing the piano at the age of five. He graduated from the New England Conservatory in Boston, and later received a fellowship through a fund established by the philanthropist Frank Huntington Beebe to continue his studies in Vienna.

Robbins was gay and lived his later years with his long-term partner, artist Michael Schell.

Awards
Robbins was nominated for an Oscar in 1992 for his score for the film Howards End (performed by Martin Jones) and in 1993 for The Remains of the Day. Additionally, he won a Sammy Film Music Award in 1992 for Howards End.

Filmography
Robbins wrote the score for the following films unless otherwise noted:
 Sweet Sounds (1976); short film; director only
 Roseland (1977); assistant to producer Ismail Merchant
 The Europeans (1979)
 Jane Austen in Manhattan (1980)
 Quartet (1981)
 Heat and Dust (1983)
 The Bostonians (1984)
 A Room with a View (1985)
 Sweet Lorraine (1987)
 My Little Girl (1987)
 Maurice (1987)
 The Perfect Murder (1988)
 Slaves of New York (1989)
 Love and Other Sorrows (1989, TV)
 Bail Jumper (1990)
 Mr & Mrs Bridge (1990)
 The Ballad of the Sad Café (1991); directed by Simon Callow
 Howards End (1992)
 The Remains of the Day (1993)
 Street Musicians of Bombay (1994); also director
 Jefferson in Paris (1995)
 Surviving Picasso (1996)
 The Proprietor (1996)
 Lumière and Company: segment "Merchant Ivory" (1996)
 The Hidden Dimension (1997)
 A Soldier's Daughter Never Cries (1998)
 Place Vendôme (1998); directed by Nicole Garcia
 Cotton Mary (1999); directed by Ismail Merchant
 The Golden Bowl (2000)
 The Girl (2000), directed by Sande Zeig
 The Mystic Masseur (2001)
 Le Divorce (2003)
 The White Countess (2005); directed by James Ivory

References

External links

 
 Richard Robbins at Epdlp (Spanish)
  Richard Robbins obituary

1940 births
2012 deaths
American film score composers
American male film score composers
Film directors from Massachusetts
LGBT film score composers
LGBT people from Massachusetts
Musicians from Massachusetts
People from Weymouth, Massachusetts